Amydon (gen: Ἀμυδῶνος) was a town of ancient Macedonia in the lower Axios region of Amphaxitis. It is mentioned by Homer, as the capital of the Paeonians, who under Pyraechmes fought on the Trojan side in the Trojan War. The exact location seems to have been unknown in historical times. Amydon was later called Abydon, but according to Strabo, it was destroyed.

References

Populated places in ancient Macedonia
Cities in ancient Macedonia
Ancient Greek cities
Geography of ancient Mygdonia
Paeonian mythology
Locations in the Iliad
Former populated places in Greece
Lost ancient cities and towns